Yuriko Yamaguchi (born 1948) is a Japanese-born American contemporary sculptor and printmaker. Using more natural mediums, she creates abstract designs that are used to reflect deeper symbolistic ideas. She currently resides near Washington, DC.

Early life and education 
Yamaguchi was born in Osaka, Japan in 1948. Unable to speak English, she moved to the United States at the age of twenty-three and used art as an outlet for expression. It was in this time where she began to build sculptures which incorporated multiple mediums, including wood and wire. Such materials were used to symbolize delicacy and simplicity within Japanese culture – a life from which she gained much artistic inspiration.

She attended the University of California, Berkeley, graduating in 1974 with a BA degree. She went on to undertake directed study at Princeton University, and completed a Master of Fine Arts at University of Maryland, College Park in 1979.

Career 
She was Visiting Assistant Professor at George Washington University in the 2000s.

Over her career, her work had been seen through solo shows and public commissions. In this time, she has presented 50 solo shows, mainly located in Japan, California and Washington DC. A brief volume of work can be seen here through the following:

Museum collections and public art 
 Hirshhorn Museum and Sculpture Garden, Smithsonian Institution, Washington, D.C.
 Philip Morris Art Collection, New York, N.Y.
 National Museum of Women in the Arts, Washington, D.C.
 Smith College Museum of Art, Northampton, MA
 Smithsonian American Art Museum, Washington, DC

Public art commissions 
 SRI, Reston, Virginia, 2017
 Jewish Federation of Greater Washington, Rockville, MD, 2015
 Washington Dulles International Airport, Station A, “Wonder of Wonders” transferred from Bethesda, 2013
 Crowell & Moring, Washington, DC, 2012
 Harman Center for the Arts, Shakes Theater, Washington, DC, 2007
 Metalwork for South Corridor Light Rail Project, Charlotte, NC, 2007
 Wall Mural, consisting 8 patinated bronze form at the New Washington Convention Center, 2003
 Wall Mural; 14’x27′ consisting 28 patinated bronze forms at Concourse T, Hartsfield International Airport, Atlanta, Georgia. Commissioned by the City of Atlanta, Department of Aviation, GA, 1999
 Wall Mural; 9’x32′ consisting of 41 patinated bronze forms located at 7475 Wisconsin Avenue, Bethesda, MD, Sponsored by JBG Associates, 1998

Solo exhibitions 
 Addison/Ripley Fine Art, Washington, DC, 2021
Werner Thoni Art Space, Barcelona, Spain, 2017
 Asia Society Texas Center, Houston, TX (Apr–Aug), 2016
  Figge Art Museum, Davenport, IA, 2015
 Adamson Gallery, Washington, DC, (Apr), 2014
 Howard Scott Gallery, New York, NY, 2011
 Towson University, Asian Gallery, Towson, MD, 2010
 Adamson Gallery, Washington, DC, 2009
 University of Maryland Gallery, College Park, MD (Sept–Dec), 2007
 Numark Gallery, Washington, DC (Nov), 2005
 Gallery NAF, Nagoya, Japan (Nov), 2004
 Koplin Gallery, Los Angeles, CA (Apr–Junes), 2002
 Emon Gallery, Japan (April), 2000
 Numark Gallery, Washington, DC, 1999
 Emon Gallery, Nagoya, Japan, 1997
 Baumgartner Galleries, Inc., Washington, DC, 1993
 Inax Gallery, Tokyo, Japan, 1992
 Koplin Gallery, Santa Monica, CA, 1991
 Penny Campbell, Newport Beach, CA, 1990
 SECCA (Southeastern Center for Contemporary Art), Winston-Salem, NC, 1986
 Washington Project for the Arts, Washington, DC, 1984
 Japanese Cultural Center, San Francisco, CA, 1975

Awards and recognition 
Yamaguchi has received recognition for her art. Many of her achievements are localized on the eastern coast of the United States or from Japanese organizations. Beginning in the 1980s, she has been awarded in every decade since, even continuing to this day. The following list is a summation of these awards:
 Werner Thoni Artspace Artists Residency, Barcelona, Spain, April–June, 2017
 Fairfax County Art Council Strauss Individual Grant, 2014
 Jentel Artist Residency Award, 2010
 Rockefeller Foundation Bellagio Center Artist Residency Award, 2009
 Myrthine & Louis Memorial Prize for Installation, the National Academy of Museum, NYC, 2008
 Finalist for Kreeger Museum Award, 2008
 American Academy of Arts and Letters Award, 2006
 Joan Mitchell Foundation Award, 2005
 Benesse Award (Japan), 2005
 Franz & Virginia Bader Foundation Grant, 2004
 Virginia Museum Professional Fellowship, 2001
 Virginia Commission of Arts Individual Grant, 2000
 Mid Atlantic/National Endowment for the Arts Regional Visual Arts Fellowship, 1995
 Virginia Commission of Arts Individual Grant, 1994
 Salzburg Kunstlerhaus Artist-Residency Grant, Virginia Center for Creative Arts, 1993
 Virginia Prize, 1990
 Virginia Museum Professional Fellowship, 1988
 Visual Arts Residency Grant, Mid Atlantic Arts Foundation, 1986
 Virginia Museum Professional Fellowship, 1985
 Fellowship, Virginia Center for Creative Arts, 1982

References

External links 
 
 Works in the National Museum of Women in Art

1948 births
Living people
20th-century Japanese women artists
20th-century American sculptors
American women artists
Artists from Washington, D.C.
George Washington University faculty
Japanese expatriates in the United States
Japanese sculptors
People from Osaka Prefecture
University of California, Berkeley alumni
University of Maryland, College Park alumni
21st-century American sculptors